John McCain was the senior United States senator from Arizona from 1987 until his death in 2018 and was the 2008 Republican nominee for President of the United States; however, he lost the election to Senator Barack Obama of Illinois. McCain was involved in many elections on local, statewide and nationwide stage since his first election to the United States House of Representatives in 1982.

House races (1982–1984)

Arizona's 1st congressional district, 1982 (Republican primary):
 John McCain – 15,363 (31.8%)
 Ray Russell – 12,500 (25.9%)
 James A. Mack – 10,675 (22.1%)
 Donna Carlson-West – 9,736 (20.17%)
 
Arizona's 1st congressional district, 1982:
 John McCain (R) – 89,116 (65.9%)
 William E. Hegarty (D) – 41,261 (30.5%)
 Richard K. Dodge (LBT) – 4,850 (3.6%)

Arizona's 1st congressional district, 1984:
 John McCain (R) (inc.) – 162,418 (78.1%)
 Harry W. Braun (D) – 45,609 (21.9%)

Senate races (1986–2016)
United States Senate election in Arizona, 1986:
 John McCain (R) – 521,850 (60.5%)
 Richard Kimball (D) – 340,965 (39.5%)

Republican primary for the United States Senate from Arizona, 1992:
 John McCain (inc.) – 201,500 (100%)

United States Senate election in Arizona, 1992:
 John McCain (R) (inc.) – 771,395 (55.8%)
 Claire Sargent (D) – 436,321 (31.6%)
 Evan Mecham (I) – 145,361 (10.5%)
 Kiana Delamare (LBT) – 22,613 (1.6%)
 Ed Finkelstein (I) – 6,335 (0.5%)
 Robert B. Winn (I) (write-in) – 26 (nil)

Republican primary for the United States Senate from Arizona, 1998:
 John McCain (inc.) – 206,490 (99.7%)
 Mark Healy (write-in) – 568 (0.3%)

United States Senate election in Arizona, 1998:
 John McCain (R) (inc.) – 696,577 (68.8%)
 Ed Ranger (D) – 275,224 (27.2%)
 John C. Zajac (LBT) – 23,004 (2.3%)
 Bob Park (Reform) – 18,288 (1.8%)
 Bill Reilley (I) (write-in) – 187 (nil)

Republican primary for the United States Senate from Arizona, 2004:
 John McCain (inc.) – 331,720 (100)

United States Senate election in Arizona, 2004:
 John McCain (R) (inc.) – 1,505,372 (76.7%)
 Stuart Starky (D) – 404,507 (20.6%)
 Ernest Hancock (LBT) – 51,798 (2.6%)

Republican primary for the United States Senate from Arizona, 2010:
 John McCain (inc.) – 284,374 	(56.2%)
 J.D. Hayworth – 162,502 	(32.1%)
 Jim Deakin – 59,447 	(11.7%)

United States Senate election in Arizona, 2010:
 John McCain (R) (inc.) – 926,372 	(59.29%)
 Rodney Glassman (D) – 540,904 	(34.6%)
 David Nolan (LBT) – 72,993 	(4.7%) 	
 Jerry Joslyn (GRN) – 22,201 	(1.4%)
Republican primary for the United States Senate from Arizona, 2016:
 John McCain (inc.) – 302,532	(51.2%)
 Kelli Ward – 235,988	(39.9%)
 Alex Meluskey – 31,159	(5.3%)
 Clair Van Steenwyk – 21,476	(3.6%)
United States Senate election in Arizona, 2016:
 John McCain (R) (inc.) – 1,359,267	(53.7%)
 Ann Kirkpatrick (D) – 1,031,245	(40.8%)
 Gary Swing (GRN) – 138,634	(5.5%)

2000 Presidential election

Washington primary for independent voters, 2000:
 John McCain (R) – 208,879 (40.1%)
 George W. Bush (R) – 118,234 (22.7%)
 Al Gore (D) – 107,950 (20.7%)
 Bill Bradley (D) – 69,352 (13.3%)
 Alan Keyes (R) – 9,369 (1.8%)
 Steve Forbes (R) – 3,387 (0.7%)
 Lyndon LaRouche (D) – 1,406 (0.3%)
 Gary Bauer (R) – 1,401 (0.3%)
 Orrin Hatch (R) – 1,240 (0.2%)

California primary for independent voters, 2000:
 John McCain (R) – 791,864 (38.0%)
 Al Gore (D) – 454,629 (21.8%)
 George W. Bush (R) – 443,304 (21.3%)
 Bill Bradley (D) – 159,772 (7.7%)
 Ralph Nader (Green) – 89,210 (4.3%)
 Alan Keyes (R) – 57,695 (2.8%)
 Donald Trump (Reform) – 14,597 (0.7%)
 Harry Browne (LBT) – 11,973 (0.6%)
 George D. Weber (Reform) – 9,173 (0.4%)
 Steve Forbes (R) – 6,035 (0.3%)
 Howard Phillips (American Independent) – 5,957 (0.3%)
 John Hagelin (Natural Law) – 4,843 (0.2%)
 Joel Kovel (Green) – 4,646 (0.2%)
 Robert Bowman (Reform) – 4,587 (0.2%)
 Others – 23,839 (1.2%)

Republican presidential primaries, 2000:
 George W. Bush – 12,034,676 (62.0%)
 John McCain – 6,061,332 (31.2%)
 Alan Keyes – 985,819 (5.1%)
 Steve Forbes – 171,860 (0.9%)
 Unpledged delegates – 61,246 (0.3%)
 Gary Bauer – 60,709 (0.3%)
 Orrin Hatch – 15,958 (0.1%)

2000 Republican National Convention (Presidential tally):
 George W. Bush – 2,058 (99.7%)
 Alan Keyes – 6 (0.3%)
 John McCain – 1 (0.1%)

2004 presidential election

Minnesota Independence Party presidential caucus, 2004:
 John Edwards – 335 (41.1%)
 John Kerry – 149 (18.3%)
 George W. Bush (inc.) – 94 (11.5%)
 Ralph Nader* – 78 (9.6%)
 None of the above – 66 (8.1%)
 Dennis Kucinich – 40 (4.9%)
 Lorna Salzman – 9 (1.1%)
 John McCain* – 9 (1.1%)
 Al Sharpton – 5 (0.6%)
 David Cobb – 4 (0.5%)
 Wesley Clark* – 4 (0.5%)
 Joe Lieberman* – 4 (0.5%)
 Howard Dean* – 3 (0.4%)
 Jesse Ventura* – 3 (0.4%)
 Gary P. Nolan* – 2 (0.3%)
 Timothy J. Penny* – 2 (0.3%)
 Kent P. Mesplay – 1 (0.1%)
 John B. Anderson* – 1 (0.1%)
 Charles W. Barkley* – 1 (0.1%)
 Dean M. Barkley* – 1 (0.1%)
 Bill Bradley* – 1 (0.1%)
 Rudy Giuliani* – 1 (0.1%)

(* – write-in)

2008 presidential election

Iowa Republican straw poll, 2008:
 Mitt Romney – 4,516 (31.6%)
 Mike Huckabee – 2,587 (18.1%)
 Sam Brownback – 2,192 (15.3%)
 Tom Tancredo – 1,961 (13.7%)
 Ron Paul – 1,305 (9.1%)
 Tommy Thompson – 1,039 (7.3%)
 Fred Thompson – 203 (1.4%)
 Rudy Giuliani – 183 (1.3%)
 Duncan Hunter – 174 (1.2%)
 John McCain – 101 (0.7%)
 John Cox – 41 (0.3%)

Republican New Hampshire Vice Presidential primary, 2008:
 John Barnes, Jr. – 40,207 (62.4%)
 John McCain* – 4,305 (6.7%)
 Mike Huckabee* – 3,227 (5.0%)
 Rudy Giuliani* – 3,164 (4.9%)
 Mitt Romney* – 2,396 (3.7%)
 Ron Paul* – 1,938 (3.0%)
 Fred Thompson* – 1,496 (2.3%)
 Duncan Hunter* – 901 (1.4%)
 Others – 3,982 (6.2%)

(* – write in)

Republican presidential primaries, 2008:
 John McCain – 9,926,234 (46.8%)
 Mitt Romney – 4,663,847 (22.0%)
 Mike Huckabee – 4,280,723 (20.2%)
 Ron Paul – 1,210,022 (5.7%)
 Rudy Giuliani – 597,494 (2.8%)
 Fred Thompson – 294,607 (1.4%)
 Uncommitted – 70,866 (0.3%)
 Alan Keyes – 59,637 (0.3%)
 Scattering – 42,822 (0.2%)
 Duncan Hunter – 39,895 (0.2%)
 Tom Tancredo – 8,595 (nil)
 John Cox – 3,351 (nil)
 Sam Brownback – 2,838 (nil)

2008 Republican National Convention (Presidential tally):
 John McCain – 2,343 (99.3%)
 Ron Paul – 15 (0.6%)
 Mitt Romney – 2 (0.1%)

2008 United States presidential election:   
 Barack Obama/Joe Biden (D) – 69,498,516 (53%) and 365 electoral votes (28 states, NE-02, and D.C. carried)
 John McCain/Sarah Palin (R) – 59,948,323 (46%) and 173 electoral votes (22 states carried)

See also

 Electoral history of Barack Obama 
 Electoral history of Ralph Nader 
 Electoral history of Sarah Palin 
 Electoral history of Hillary Clinton
 Electoral history of Joe Biden 
 Electoral history of Kamala Harris

References

McCain, John
John McCain